Heinrich XXVII, Prince Reuss Younger Line (10 November 185821 November 1928) was the last reigning Prince Reuss Younger Line from 1913 to 1918. Then he became Head of the House of Reuss Younger Line from 1918 to 1928.

Early life
Heinrich XXVII was born at Gera, eldest child of Heinrich XIV, Prince Reuss Younger Line (1832–1913), (son of Heinrich LXVII, Prince Reuss Younger Line, and Princess Adelheid Reuss-Ebersdorf) and his wife, Duchess Agnes of Württemberg (1835–1886), (daughter of Duke Eugen of Württemberg and Princess Helene of Hohenlohe-Langenburg).

Prince Reuss Younger Line
At the death of his father on 29 March 1913 he inherited the throne of the Principality. He also continued as regent of Reuss Elder Line, because of a physical and mental disability of Prince Heinrich XXIV due to an accident in his childhood.

Prince Heinrich XXVII abdicated in 1918 after the German Revolution of 1918–19, when all German monarchies were abolished.

With the death of Heinrich XXIV in 1927, the Elder Line became extinct and its titles passed to Heinrich XXVII, who thus became the sole Prince Reuss.

Marriage
Heinrich XXVII married on 11 November 1884 at Langenburg to Princess Elise of Hohenlohe-Langenburg (1864–1929), elder daughter of Hermann, Prince of Hohenlohe-Langenburg, and his wife, Princess Leopoldine of Baden.

They had five children:
Princess Viktoria Reuss Younger Line (21 April 1889 – 18 December 1918), married in 1917 to Duke Adolf Friedrich of Mecklenburg-Schwerin, had issue.
Princess Luise Reuss Younger Line (17 July 1890 – 12 August 1951)
Prince Heinrich XL Reuss Younger Line (17 September 1891 – 4 November 1891)
Prince Heinrich XLIII Reuss Younger Line (25 July 1893 – 13 May 1912)
Heinrich XLV, Hereditary Prince Reuss Younger Line (13 May 1895 – 1945)

Ancestry

Notes and sources

The Royal House of Stuart, London, 1969, 1971, 1976, Addington, A. C., Reference: II 221,223
Genealogisches Handbuch des Adels, Fürstliche Häuser, Reference: 1956

1858 births
1928 deaths
People from Gera
People from the Principality of Reuss-Gera
Princes of Reuss
Monarchs who abdicated
Generals of Cavalry (Prussia)
Regents of Germany
Non-inheriting heirs presumptive